Alexandre Correia Alfaiate (born 17 August 1995) is a Portuguese professional footballer who plays as a defender for Lusitano.

Club career
On 9 August 2014, Alfaiate made his debut with S.L. Benfica B in a 2014–15 Segunda Liga match against C.D. Trofense where he played the entire match as left back. On 30 July 2017, he signed a two-year contract with Belgian First Division B side A.F.C. Tubize.

Personal life
He is an identical twin brother of Rúben Alfaiate.

Honours
Benfica
UEFA Youth League: Runner-up 2013–14

References

External links
 
 
 
 National team data 
 Alexandre Alfaiate at ZeroZero

1995 births
Living people
People from Peniche, Portugal
Twin sportspeople
Portuguese twins
Portuguese footballers
Association football defenders
Liga Portugal 2 players
Challenger Pro League players
Primera Divisió players
S.L. Benfica B players
Associação Académica de Coimbra – O.A.F. players
A.F.C. Tubize players
FC Lusitanos players
Lusitano FCV players
FC Ordino players
Portuguese expatriate sportspeople in Belgium
Expatriate footballers in Belgium
Portuguese expatriate sportspeople in Andorra
Expatriate footballers in Andorra
Portugal youth international footballers
Sportspeople from Leiria District